The Honourable Thomas Harley (24 August 1730 – 1 December 1804) was a British politician who sat in the House of Commons for 41 years from 1761 to 1802.

Harley was the fourth son of Edward Harley, 3rd Earl of Oxford and Earl Mortimer and educated at Westminster School.

He became an alderman of London, Sheriff of London in 1764 and Lord Mayor of London in 1767.  He served as Member of Parliament for London from 1761 to 1774 and then for his native Herefordshire for most of the rest of his life.

In 1775 he bought the Berrington estate near Eye, Herefordshire from the Cornewall family and built Berrington Hall in 1778–1781 in place of an older house. It is now classified as a Grade I listed building.

He was elected Mayor of Shrewsbury for 1784–85 and appointed Lord Lieutenant of Radnorshire for April 1791 to August 1804.

He died in December, 1804. He had married in 1752, Anne, the daughter of Edward Bangham, deputy Auditor of the Imprest. They had two sons, who both predeceased him, and five daughters. He gave Berrington to his daughter Anne when she married George Rodney (1753–1802), the son of Admiral George Brydges Rodney, 1st Baron Rodney. Another daughter Martha married George Drummond of Stanmore.

See also
List of Lord Mayors of London
List of Sheriffs of London

References

Burkes Peerage (1851 edition)

1730 births
1804 deaths
People from Herefordshire
People educated at Westminster School, London
Politics of Herefordshire
Younger sons of earls
Lord-Lieutenants of Radnorshire
Members of the Parliament of Great Britain for English constituencies
British MPs 1761–1768
British MPs 1768–1774
British MPs 1774–1780
British MPs 1780–1784
British MPs 1784–1790
British MPs 1790–1796
British MPs 1796–1800
Members of the Parliament of the United Kingdom for English constituencies
UK MPs 1801–1802
Sheriffs of the City of London
18th-century lord mayors of London
Thomas
Mayors of places in Shropshire